Nwakaeme is a Nigerian surname. Notable people with the surname include:

Anthony Nwakaeme (born 1989), Nigerian football forward 
Dickson Nwakaeme (born 1986), Nigerian football forward, brother of Anthony

Surnames of Nigerian origin